Burning Boy: The Life and Work of Stephen Crane is a biographical book on Stephen Crane by Paul Auster which was published on October 26, 2021.

Awards 

 Los Angeles Times Book Prize for Biography in 2021

References 

Books by Paul Auster
2021 non-fiction books
American biographies
Henry Holt and Company books